Grafenegg is a market town (Municipality) in the Krems-Land district of Lower Austria, Austria.

History
Originally called Etsdorf-Haitzendorf, it changed its name in 2003.

Population

Sights

Grafenegg is renowned for Schloss Grafenegg, owned by the Duke of Ratibor, Prince of Corvey of the House of Hohenlohe. The castle grounds are the site of the Grafenegg Music Festival and sculpture garden.

References

Cities and towns in Krems-Land District